Juan Francis Armenteros (June 24, 1928 – October 8, 2003) was a professional Cuban baseball player in the Negro leagues. He played as a catcher for a number of teams including the Kansas City Monarchs from 1953 to 1955 as well as the Havana Cubans from 1951 to 1953. Armenteros played in the 1953 East-West All-Star Game as well as the Negro leagues all-star team for three years.

Personal life
Armenteros got married in 1958 and retired from baseball as a result of not wanting to subject his wife to the poor living conditions in the Negro leagues.

Career
Armenteros played as a catcher for a number of teams, including the Kansas City Monarchs and the Havana Cubans. He appeared in the 1953 East-West All-Star Game.  He also played on the Negro leagues all-star team for three years, where he compiled a .327 batting average.

According to Negro leagues player John Mitchell, Armenteros was very good. He played from 1956 to 1958 in minor league baseball. Armenteros died on October 8, 2003.

References

1928 births
2003 deaths
Havana Cubans players
Kansas City Monarchs players
Cuban baseball players
Baseball catchers
21st-century African-American people
People from Sagua la Grande